Constantin ("Costică") Bălan (born August 25, 1964 in Băcani, Vaslui) is a retired male racewalker from Romania. He twice competed for his native country in the men's 20 km race walk event at the Summer Olympics: 1996 and 2000.

Achievements

References
 
 

1964 births
Living people
Romanian male racewalkers
Athletes (track and field) at the 1996 Summer Olympics
Athletes (track and field) at the 2000 Summer Olympics
Olympic athletes of Romania
Sportspeople from Vaslui